Nasuh (also spelled Nasouh) is an Arabic masculine given name that may refer to:

Given name
 Matrakçı Nasuh (1480 – c. 1564), Ottoman Bosnian polymath
 Nasouh Al Nakdali (born 1993), Syrian footballer
 Nasuh Akar (1925–1984), Turkish sports wrestler
 Nasuh Mahruki (born 1968), Turkish mountain climber
 Nasuh Pasha (died 1614), Ottoman statesman and grand vizier

Other uses
 Treaty of Nasuh Pasha, treaty between Ottoman Turkey and Safavid Persia after the war of 1603 - 1612

Arabic masculine given names
Turkish masculine given names